Sunken Water is the third studio album by the New Zealand rock band Pluto, was released on 22 October 2007. It is the follow-up to the double platinum Pipeline Under the Ocean, and their last studio album to date.

Track listing
French Grave
Forgiveness
Waiting Watching
Rat-A-Tat
Nineteen Sixty Three
The Soul Is A Whore
Polaroid Girl
Decisions Decisions
Chemistry
The Volunteer
When The Water Sinks
Night Light
Cul De Sac (iTunes bonus track)

Pluto (New Zealand band) albums
2007 albums